Johanna Melzer (7 April 1904 - 3 October 1960) was a German political activist (KPD) who participated in resistance to the Hitler regime.   She spent eleven of the twelve Nazi years in prison, earning the soubriquet "Iron Johanna" ("Eiserne Johanna") because she stayed silent under torture.   She survived and became, for a time, a regional politician in West Germany.

Life
Johanna Melzer was born in Oberwaldenburg, a mining village in Lower Silesia close to the German frontier with Bohemia, southwest of Breslau.   Her father was a miner.   While she was still a child the family relocated to the Ruhr region in connection with her father's work:  she attended junior school in Rünthe, before moving on to a commercially focused secondary school in Hamm.    Melzer trained for work as a sales assistant and for clerical employment.   The family were politically conscious, and in 1923 she joined both the Communist Party and its youth wing.   From 1925 till 1930 she was employed as a book keeper with the "Ruhr-Echo", a daily newspaper.   Between 1925 and 1932 she lived with Walter Duddins, a Communist activist to whom, she later wrote, she owed a large part of her own political awakening.   Locally she became a leader of the Red Front Women's Alliance ("Rote Frauen und Mädchenbund") in Bochum.   In 1928/29 she was listed as the party's Agitation and Propaganda chief for the Bochum sub-district.

In 1930 she moved to Thuringia where she became a member of the party regional leadership team ("Bezirksleitung") in Erfurt.  Here she also worked as the book keeper and treasurer of the local Red Aid ("Rote Hilfe") communist workers' welfare organisation.   She remained in Erfurt till 1932, also serving as a party instructor and, towards the end of her time, leader in the women's department of the regional party leadership.

By March 1933 she had returned to the Dortmund area.   In January 1933 the political backdrop was transformed when the Nazi Party took power and converted Germany into a one-party dictatorship.   Political activity - except in support of the Nazi Party - became illegal.   At the end of February the Reichstag fire was instantly blamed on the Communists, and in March 1933 Communists began to be arrested.   From March 1933 Melzer was working illegally as a "party instructor" in the Dortmund area and in July 1933 she was arrested.   She was placed in the Moringen concentration camp where she remained till December 1933.

Soon after the Nazi take-over Melzer arranged that the "Oblies" dress shop in Dortmund, where she was a customer, would become a focal point for resistance activists.  Various Communist Party newspapers were distributed from there, such as "The Red Flag" ("Die Rote Fahne") and "The International" as well as a publication that hid its identity behind the camouflaging name "Rolleiflex".   Because of intelligence received from the Gestapo in Berlin. local police were already aware of this arrangement by the end of 1933, and of the significance of the phrase "I've come from the Lyon boutique" ("Ich komme vom Modehaus Lyon") which resistance fighters used to identify themselves.   Along with her activities in Dortmund, Johanna Metzler worked illegally as a "party instructor" in Bielefeld, Osnabrück and Hagen, in and beyond the eastern part of the Ruhr industrial conurbation.

She herself was re-arrested on 26 August 1934 and held under investigatory detention, initially at the infamous "Steinwache" interrogation prison beside the Main Railway Station in Dortmund.   She was held here for some time during which she underwent a sustained period of interrogation and sustained serious mistreatment, according to one source "isolated for weeks on end" and "bound hand and foot".  It was during this time that she earned from fellow detainees the soubriquet "Iron Johanna" ("Eiserne Johanna") because she stayed silent under torture.   A couple of weeks after her arrest, on 7 September 1934, she wrote a letter to her parents and family.   The letter was intercepted by the prison censors, but today it is retained in the archives of the high court at Hamm, where it provides a lasting testimony to Johanna Metzler's mental strength and courage.  She was subsequently transferred to Hamm where she appeared before the High Court on 1 March 1935,   She was charged with "the crime of preparing a highly treasonable undertaking" ("Verbrechens der Vorbereitung eines hochverräterischen Unternehmens").   The prosecution demanded a death sentence, but the court sentenced her to a fifteen-year term of imprisonment plus ten years of deprivation of civil rights.

Melzer spent the next ten years in a succession of prisons.   War ended early in May 1945:  she was liberated from prison by allied forces on 4 May 1945.   She moved to Thuringia where she became head of the women's section with the Communist party leadership in Erfurt.   Thuringia had been successfully invaded during the opening months of 1945 by the American army, but under terms already agreed between the allied leaders the area was to be incorporated into the Soviet occupation zone (after 1949 the German Democratic Republic).  On 3 July 1945 the American military withdrew, and for the rest of Mezler's time in Erfurt the city was administered by the Soviets.Towards the end of 1946 she returned to Dortmund, now administered as part of the British occupation zone (after 1949 part of the German Federal Republic).   Here she joined the party regional leadership team ("Bezirksleitung") for the Ruhr region.   She was appointed a member of the Westphalia provincial assembly in 1946, and following a return to democracy she was elected a member of its successor body, the Landtag (regional legislature) of North Rhine-Westphalia, for a three-year term starting in 1947.   During her time in the assembly she was vocal in support of equal pay for women and in opposition to the production of more nuclear bombs.

After this she was a co-founder, in 1950, of a West German outpost of the Democratic Women's League ("Demokratischer Frauenbund Deutschlands" / DFD), becoming its secretary.   In 1954 she became a member of the Communist Party Control Commission.   It was not till August 1956 that the Communist Party was banned in West German (reflecting "the aggressive and combative methods that the party used as a "Marxist-Leninist party struggle" to achieve their goals") but as the political differences between East and West Germany became ever more stark, especially after the 1953 East German uprising, the Communist Party became increasingly marginalised in West Germany, and in 1953 Johanna Mezler faced an arrest warrant in connection with her political activity.   The more direct concern for the authorities in West Germany appears to have involved not her Communist Party membership, but her position within the  DFD which was seen as a proxy for the East German government and its ruling party.   She went into hiding and appears to have avoided arrest.

The political separation implicit in the military occupation zones created in 1945 came to be enforced by a physical frontier during the 1950s.   In 1956 Melzer relocated to East Berlin where she lived till her death there on the night of 2/3 October 1960.   There are suggestions that her health was damaged and her life thereby shortened by torture she had suffered at the hands of the Gestapo.   Her sister Klara's attempts to have the 1953 indictment lifted posthumously were rejected by the West German authorities who inferred that her relocation to East Germany in 1956 was tantamount to a confession of guilt.

References

1904 births
1960 deaths
Members of the Landtag of North Rhine-Westphalia
People from the Province of Lower Silesia
Politicians from Dortmund
Communists in the German Resistance
Communist Party of Germany politicians
20th-century German women politicians
People from Wałbrzych
Female resistance members of World War II
20th-century German women
People convicted of treason against Germany